The Royal Scottish Country Dance Society (RSCDS), was founded on 28 November 1923 as the Scottish Country Dance Society by Jean Milligan and Ysobel Stewart of Fasnacloich, who wanted to preserve country dancing as performed in Scotland, country dancing having fallen into disuse after the influx of continental ballroom dances such as the waltz or quadrilles and, later on, American-style dances like the One-step or foxtrot. (The SCDS did not become the RSCDS until 1951.)

The RSCDS collected dances from living memory as well as from old (17-19c.) manuscripts and republished them in a series of books. Most of these dances needed some interpretation, and the dance style itself underwent serious standardisation, becoming much more balletic instead of the easy-going style that was the norm in the early 20th century, and which the RSCDS's founders considered sloppy and untraditional. After some argument, in the late 1940s the RSCDS also started publishing newly devised dances.

Today the RSCDS numbers some 11.000 members all over the world, served from the headquarters in Edinburgh, and the continuous well-being of the Scottish country dance scene is largely due to the efforts of the Society. The RSCDS offers teacher training and holds an annual summer school in St Andrews, Fife for four weeks in July and August. In addition to the annual summer school, the RSCDS offers a winter school in February and a youth orientated Spring Fling in April, which is held in the UK and Europe respectively.

References

External links

Official website
RSCDS Australia website
University of St Andrews Celtic Society
Dunedin

See also
List of Scottish country dances

1923 establishments in Scotland
Scottish folk music
 
Dance organizations
Scottish Country Dance Society
Organisations based in Edinburgh
Fife
Music organisations based in Scotland